"Wish You Well" is the first single from Australian rock musician Bernard Fanning's solo debut album, Tea and Sympathy, released in 2005 and was voted number 1 on the Triple J Hottest 100 of 2005. "Wish You Well" peaked in the top 30 on the New Zealand Singles Chart.

Production
In 2005 in an interview with Triple J, Bernard Fanning revealed that they smashed plates in the studio to create an interesting snare sound which can be heard very faintly on every second snare hit throughout the song. "We tried using hand claps and tambourines, but the sound wasn't quite 'right', so we ended up using the smashing plates."

Music video
The music video for "Wish You Well" was directed by Damon Escott and Stephen Lance of Head Pictures and won ARIA Award for Best Video at ARIA Music Awards of 2006. 

The video clip starts with Fanning sitting adjacent to antiques, one including a gramophone. After standing up he holds a portrait of the forest.

Charts

Other appearances
The Acoustic Album (2006, Virgin)

References

2005 singles
2005 songs
Bernard Fanning songs
ARIA Award-winning songs
Song recordings produced by Tchad Blake